Cloprednol is a synthetic glucocorticoid. It has been investigated for use in asthma.

References

Corticosteroids
Organochlorides